Ivan Shavov (born 17 September 1943) is a Bulgarian former wrestler who competed in the 1968 Summer Olympics and in the 1972 Summer Olympics.

References

External links
 

1943 births
Living people
Olympic wrestlers of Bulgaria
Wrestlers at the 1968 Summer Olympics
Wrestlers at the 1972 Summer Olympics
Bulgarian male sport wrestlers